Marco Gonthier (born 26 December 1976 in St Hycacinthe) is a former Canadian professional darts player who participated in many Quebec and Halifax Opens.

Biography
Gonthier appeared at the Quebec Open for the first time on January 19, 2008 and after that participated at the BDO World Darts Championship on December 4 of the same year. Three days later, he took part in the World Masters where he scored last in 64 have losing to Ian Jones 3-2 (sets). On January 18, 2009 he became a quarter finalist at the Quebec Open and on January 17 of next year became its winner. On March 7 of the same year, he became a Halifax Open quarter finalist and than played last 16 at both the Quebec Open on January 16, 2011 and at the Halifax Open on March 6 of the same year. On January 21, 2012 he became a semi finalist at Quebec Open and then played last 16 at the Halifax Open during both 2012 and 2013 seasons. In June 2017 he represented Quebec at the National Darts Championship in Saint-Jean, New Brunswick. He resides in Saint-Léon-Le-Grand.

References

Living people
Canadian darts players
1976 births
British Darts Organisation players